Ellise Chappell (born 21 March 1992) is an English actress. She is best known for her roles as Morwenna Chynoweth in Poldark and as Jennifer Strange in The Last Dragonslayer.

Early life and education 
Chappell was born and raised in rural Warwickshire, her mother was an artist, her father runs a creative agency, while her elder brother went on to be a video choreographer. She was educated at The King's High School for Girls, a private school for girls in Warwick. After completing her time at school she applied for Royal Academy of Dramatic Art and Guildhall School of Music and Drama; however, she was unsuccessful in the applications. Instead Chappell studied English literature at the University of Sheffield, before deciding to switch to studying drama at the University of Exeter, where she graduated in 2014.  She took a nine-month intensive course on acting, before moving to London, where she joined the National Youth Theatre and performed in the West End.

Career 
Chappell was part of the National Youth Theatre REP Company in 2015, where she starred in Wuthering Heights by Emily Brontë, The Merchant of Venice by William Shakespeare and Consensual by Evan Placey. She then landed the role of Jennifer Strange in the 2016 Sky TV series adaptation of The Last Dragonslayer, before starring as Wendy Roberts in Anthony Horowitz's BBC TV series New Blood. Chappell has also been a regular in the BBC series Poldark since its third season, playing Morwenna Chynoweth. She plays Lucy in the 2019 film Yesterday, and plays Mona in the Netflix series Young Wallander.

Filmography

Film

Television

Games

References

External links 
 Agent profile website page
 Official Instagram
 

1992 births
Living people
English film actresses
21st-century English actresses
English television actresses
National Youth Theatre members
Alumni of the University of Sheffield
Alumni of the University of Exeter
People from Warwickshire